Hot Wheel may refer to:

Hot Wheel Roller Derby, a league based in Leeds in England
Hot Wheels, a brand of toy car
Hot wheel defect detector, a railway sensor designed to detect sticking brakes